The Bachelor Father  is a 1931 American pre-Code MGM comedy drama film directed by Robert Z. Leonard and starring Marion Davies and featuring Ralph Forbes, C. Aubrey Smith, Ray Milland and Guinn "Big Boy" Williams. It was based on a same-titled play by Edward Childs Carpenter, with Smith re-creating his role from the Broadway production. The plot centers around a stuffy British nobleman whose three grown (and illegitimate) children suddenly arrive at his estate and decide to move in with him.

Plot summary
Sir Basil Algernon Winterton (C. Aubrey Smith) is an elderly nobleman in poor health who decides to seek out his illegitimate children around the world so that he can know them before he dies. Marion Davies plays Antoinette "Toni" Flagg, a girl from America whose mother died when she was young, and she is summoned to England by Sir Basil's henchman.

Once there, she meets her brother and sister, also brought here for the first time, and together they meet their father and begin to know him. While initially he bristles at their individuality, with Toni especially grating his patience, he soon comes to love them all. One day however, Toni discovers that it was actually her half sister, 20 years deceased, who was sir Basil's daughter, and she is of no relation to him. While she tries to tell Sir Basil, his love for her (and hers in return) prevent her from doing so, but when it eventually comes out, he suspects her of betraying him and sends her away.

Heartbroken, Toni tries to leave London by joining a risky trans-Atlantic flight back to New York. Hearing this, Sir Basil realizes how much he cares for Toni and tries to stop her before it's too late.

Cast (in credits order)
 Marion Davies as Antoinette Flagg
 Ralph Forbes as John Ashley
 C. Aubrey Smith as Sir Basil Algernon Winterton
 Ray Milland as Geoffrey Trent
 Guinn "Big Boy" Williams as Richard Berney
 David Torrence as Dr Frank MacDonald
 Doris Lloyd as Mrs Julia Webb
 Edgar Norton as Bolton, The Second Butler
 Nina Quartero as Maria Credaro
 Halliwell Hobbes as Larkin, The Butler
 James Gordon as Carson Creswell, a lawyer

Foreign-language version
One foreign-language version was produced by MGM in French and was entitled Le père célibataire. It was released in 1931 and starred Lili Damita.

References

External links
 
 
 
 

1931 films
American black-and-white films
Metro-Goldwyn-Mayer films
Films directed by Robert Z. Leonard
1931 drama films
American drama films
1930s English-language films
1930s American films